Arjumand Rahim (born 1 January 1974) is a Pakistani television actress, director and producer. She has been seen in different television serials at different channels. She is best known for her character "Pari" in Suno Chanda 2.

Career 
Arjumand started her career as an actress in 1995 from her college. Later in 2004 she started acting in many serials. In 2006 she opened her own production house "Art RepuWik". She produced Shahrukh Khan Ki Maut in 2005 and also produced Hotel for TVOne Global.

Filmography

Television

References

External links 
 
 Arjumand Rahim at the TV.com.pk

Living people
Pakistani television actresses
Pakistani television directors
Pakistani television producers
Actresses from Karachi
20th-century Pakistani actresses
21st-century Pakistani actresses
Women television producers
1980 births
Women television directors
PTV Award winners